Sebasti Arul Christopher Vasanth (SAC Vasanth) is an Indian magician, illusionist and laser show artist who performs shows in India, Burkina Faso, Dubai and globally. He was titled as "Master Magician" by Star One television in 2010.

Early life
Vasanth was born on 22 August 1974 in Coimbatore, Tamil Nadu, India.

Television shows
 'Maya Maya' in Doordarshan.
 'G Boom Vikram' in Vijay TV.
 'Fox History and Entertainment' in BBC.
 'Logic illa Magic' in Kalaignar TV.
 'Star One, India’s Magic Star' in STAR One.
 'Comedy Circus ka Jadoo' in Sony Entertainment Television (India)

Awards and honors
 "Best Creative Magician Award" in Hyderabad for the Year 2004
 "Best innovative Magician Award" in Howrah for the Year 2005
 "Dr. Mgr. Bharat Rathna Award" for the year 2009
 Star One television titled him as "Master Magician" in 2010
 Comedy Circus Ka Jadoo crowned him as "Prince of Indian Magic"  in 2011
 Global Leadership Awards 2014 – Award for Excellence in the Art of Illusions

References

Further reading
 

1974 births
Living people
Indian magicians
People from Coimbatore